Belgrade City Administration ( / Uprava grada Beograda), was an administrative district of the Kingdom of Yugoslavia from 1929 to 1941. Its administrative center was Belgrade.

History
The Kingdom of Serbs, Croats and Slovenes was formed in 1918 and was initially divided into counties and districts (1918–1922) and administrative oblasts (1922-1929). In 1929, name of the country was changed to Kingdom of Yugoslavia and new administrative units known as banovinas (Serbo-Croatian: banovine, бановине) were introduced. The whole country was divided into 9 banovinas, while area around capital Belgrade was organized as a separate district known as the Belgrade City Administration. Before 1929, territory of Belgrade City Administration was divided between the Belgrade Oblast and the Syrmia Oblast.

In 1941, following Axis invasion, occupation and partition of Yugoslavia, the district was abolished and most of its territory was incorporated into newly formed districts of Belgrade and Veliki Bečkerek within German-occupied Serbia. A smaller part of the district was attached to Vuka County within the Independent State of Croatia.

Geography
The Belgrade City Administration was completely surrounded by Danube Banovina, whose capital was Novi Sad. The administration included the city of Belgrade, as well as neighboring cities of Zemun and Pančevo.

Demographics
Inhabitants of the district were mainly Serbs, but members of some other ethnicities (Germans, Hungarians, Croats, etc) were present in the area.

References

Further reading
Istorijski atlas, Geokarta, Beograd, 1999.
Istorijski atlas, Intersistem kartografija, Beograd, 2010.

External links
Map of the district
Map of the district
Map of the district
Map of the district

20th century in Vojvodina
Yugoslav Serbia
Banovinas of the Kingdom of Yugoslavia
1929 establishments in Yugoslavia
1941 disestablishments in Yugoslavia
1920s in Belgrade
1930s in Belgrade
1940s in Belgrade